Ludia is a video game developer based in Montreal, Quebec, Canada that creates and distributes cross-platform digital games with mass consumer appeal. Ludia produces original and branded properties based on game shows, television series, movies, books and board games. In addition to developing games for Facebook, iOS, Android and Amazon, Ludia has created games for Nintendo DS, Microsoft Windows, Mac, PlayStation 3, Xbox 360, with Kinect, and Wii in the past.

The company works with the owners of original and branded properties such as Fremantle,  DreamWorks Animation, Universal, Sony, CBS, BBC Worldwide, MGM Television, Disney and creates video games based on brands such as The Price Is Right, Family Feud/Family Fortunes, Press Your Luck, The 10,000 Dollar Pyramid, Hollywood Squares, Hole in the Wall, Are You Smarter Than A 5th Grader?, The Weakest Link and Who Wants To Be A Millionaire.

In addition to game show properties, Ludia creates games based on brands such as Jurassic World, Jurassic Park, How To Train Your Dragon, The Flintstones, Where's Waldo, Popeye, Betty Boop, Hell's Kitchen, The Amazing Race and The Bachelor.

Fremantle acquired a majority stake in Ludia in October 2010. In September 2021, Ludia was acquired by Jam City for $165 million.

History
Ludia was founded on March 15, 2007, by industry veterans and headed by Alexandre Thabet, CEO. In that same year, Ludia signs its first licensing deals with Fremantle (The Price Is Right) and Fox (Hell's Kitchen).

In 2008, Ludia launched its first game based on The Price is Right on Wii, DS, PC and iOS. In 2011, Ludia adopted the "Free to Play" or “Pay to Win” model. From 2009 to 2013, YouTube users played Ludia's video games, including Family Feud, The Price is Right and Press Your Luck. These videos continued the success for Ludia's video games. From 2008 to 2014, Ludia published video games based on popular game shows, and as of 2017, all of Ludia's video games based on game shows are now no longer available to play on the App Store, however you can still play Ludia's former titles on the game consoles of the company released them on. Ludia's last game based on a game show was the sequel to Family Feud & Friends, Family Feud & Friends 2 released on August 2, 2014. This game is still available to play, but has since been renamed Family Feud Live!, and re-released on the App Store on May 25, 2017, by new game developer Umi and Fremantle. Ludia is no longer part of development in this renamed game.  Ludia had a large library of games that were popular in the underground, but unfortunately, these games have been discontinued.

List of games
The following is a list of games developed by Ludia.
 All In & Friends (iOS devices only)
 Are You Smarter Than A 5th Grader? & Friends for iOS and Android
 Are You Smarter Than A 5th Grader? for iOS, Android, Facebook and Amazon Appstore
 Battlestar Galactica: Squadrons for iOS, Android, Facebook and Amazon Appstore
 Betty Boop Slots for iOS, Android and Facebook
 Bowling & Friends for iOS and Android
 Buzzr Casino for iOS and Android
 Dragons: Rise of Berk for iOS, Android, Facebook and Amazon Appstore
 DreamWorks Dragons: Titan Uprising (2019) for iOS and Android
 DC Heroes & Villains (2021) for iOS and Android
 Disney Wonderful Worlds (2021) for iOS and Android
 Family Feud: 2010 Edition (2009) for iOS only
 Family Feud Decades (2010) for iOS only
 Family Feud: 2012 Edition (2011) for Wii & Xbox 360 systems only, Kinect optional
 Family Feud & Friends for iOS, Android, and Amazon Appstore
 Family Feud & Friends 2 for Android, iOS, Facebook and Amazon Appstore
 Family Fortunes (2010) for iOS devices only available in the U.K.
 Family Fortunes & Friends for iOS devices only available in the U.K.
 Fairy Tale Slots! for iOS and Facebook
 Flip Chip Poker
 Game Show Party (2010) "a bundle pack of The Price Is Right: 2010 Edition, Family Feud: 2010 Edition & Press Your Luck: 2010 Edition exclusively for the PS3 via PSN"
 Hell's Kitchen (2008) for PC, Mac, Wii, DS, and iOS
 Hell's Kitchen VS. for iOS only
 Hole In The Wall (2011) for Xbox 360 only, Kinect required
 Hollywood Squares (2010) for PC, Wii, iOS and PS3 via PSN
 Jurassic Park Builder (2012) for iOS, Android, Facebook and Amazon Appstore
 Jurassic World: The Game (2015) for iOS, Android and Amazon Appstore
 Jurassic World Alive (2018) for iOS and Android
 Linkies Puzzle Rush for iOS only
 Lovelink (2020) For iOS and Android
 Mr. Peabody & Sherman for iOS and Android
 Planet Fish for Wiiware (2010) and iOS (2011)
 Popeye Slots for iOS and Android
 Press Your Luck for DS, Wii, PC, Mac and iOS
 Press Your Luck Slots for iOS and Facebook
 Save Our Village for iOS only
 The Amazing Race (2010) for Wii and iOS
 Teenage Mutant Ninja Turtles Legends for iOS, Android and Amazon Appstore
 The Bachelor: The Videogame
 The Flintstones: Bring Back Bedrock for iOS, Android and Amazon Appstore
 The Price Is Right (2008)
 The Price Is Right: 2010 Edition (2009)
 The Price Is Right Decades (2011) for iOS, Android, Amazon Appstore, Wii, Xbox 360 and PS3, Kinect optional
 The Price Is Right Slots for iOS, Android, Facebook and Amazon Appstore
 The Price Is Right Bingo for iOS, Android, Facebook and Amazon Appstore
 The Weakest Link & Friends for iOS only
 The $1,000,000 Pyramid (2011) for Wii and iOS only
 Underworld for iOS, Android, Facebook and Amazon Appstore
 Warriors of Waterdeep (Dungeons and Dragons) (2019) for iOS and Android
 What’s Your Story for iOS and Android
 Where's Waldo & Friends for iOS, Android and Amazon Appstore
 Where's Waldo?: The Fantastic Journey (2009) for PC, Mac, Wii, DS, and iOS
 Where's Waldo?/Wally in Hollywood for iOS only
 Who Wants To Be A Millionaire (2010) for PC, Wii, DS and PlayStation 3
 Who Wants To Be A Millionaire: 2012 Edition (2011) for Xbox 360 only, Kinect required
 Who Wants To Be A Millionaire & Friends for iOS, Android, Facebook and Amazon Appstore

References

External links
 

2007 establishments in Quebec
Canadian companies established in 2007
Video game companies established in 2007
Video game companies of Canada
Video game development companies
Companies based in Montreal
RTL Group
2021 mergers and acquisitions
Canadian subsidiaries of foreign companies